Heiðar is a male Icelandic given name. Notable people with the name include:
Haukur Heiðar Hauksson (born 1991), Icelandic football right back
Heiðar Helguson (born 1977), Icelandic footballer
Heiðar Geir Júlíusson (born 1987), football midfielder from Akureyri on Iceland who currently plays for Swedish Division 2 club IFK Uddevalla
Gunnar Heiðar Þorvaldsson, commonly anglicised as Gunnar Heidar Thorvaldsson (born 1982), Icelandic footballer

See also
Heiðr